Flag of WA may mean:

Flag of Washington
Flag of Western Australia